The Ospika pipe is a small composite diatreme in northern British Columbia, Canada, located approximately  north-northwest of Mackenzie, on the east side of Williston Lake between the Peace Reach and Ospika River.

See also
 Volcanism in Canada
 Kechika River

References

Diatremes of British Columbia